The Jivacch Link Express is an Express train belonging to Northeast Frontier Railway zone that runs between  and New Tinsukia junction in India. It is currently being operated with 25909/25910 train numbers on daily basis.

Service

The 25909/Jivacch Link Express has an average speed of 42 km/hr and covers 1434 km in 33h 55m. The 25910/Jivachh Link Express has an average speed of 41 km/hr and covers 1434 km in 33h 50m.

Route and halts 

The important halts of the train are:

 
 
 
 
 
 
 
 Jagiroad
 
 
 
 
 
 
 
 New Jalpaiguri (Siliguri)

Coach composition

The train has standard ICF rakes with a maximum speed of 110 kmph. The train consists of 7 coaches:

 1 AC III Tier coach
 1 Sleeper coach

Traction

Both trains are hauled by a Siliguri Loco Shed-based WDP-4D diesel locomotive from Dibrugarh to Katihar. From Katihar the train is hauled by a Ghaziabad Loco Shed-based WAP-4 electric locomotive as far as Samastipur. From Samastipur the train is hauled by a Samastipur Loco Shed-based WDM-3A diesel locomotive to Darbhanga and vice versa.

See also 

 Dibrugarh railway station
 Darbhanga Junction railway station
 Kamla Ganga Intercity Fast Passenger
 Avadh Assam Express

Notes

References

External links 

 25909/Jivacch Link Express India Rail Info
 25910/Jivachh Link Express India Rail Info

Transport in Dibrugarh
Transport in Darbhanga
Named passenger trains of India
Rail transport in Assam
Rail transport in Nagaland
Rail transport in West Bengal
Rail transport in Bihar
Railway services introduced in 2012
Express trains in India